The Holly River is a tributary of the Elk River in central West Virginia in the United States. The river was named for the holly bushes along its course.

The Holly River is formed by the confluence of its Left Fork and its Right Fork:

The Holly River’s course and the lower reaches of the left and right forks are part of the Elk River Wildlife Management Area.

According to the West Virginia Department of Environmental Protection, approximately 97% of the Holly River watershed is forested, mostly deciduous.  Approximately 2% is used for pasture and agriculture.

See also
List of rivers of West Virginia

References

External links

Rivers of West Virginia
Rivers of Webster County, West Virginia
Rivers of Braxton County, West Virginia
Elk River (West Virginia)